The ornate spider monkey (Ateles geoffroyi ornatus) is a subspecies of Geoffroy's spider monkey, a type of New World monkey, from Central America, native to Costa Rica and Panama.  Other common names for this subspecies include the brilliant spider monkey, the common spider monkey, the red spider monkey, the Panama spider ape, and the Azuero spider monkey; the latter two of which were previously thought to be distinct subspecies, panamensis and azuerensis, respectively.

References

External links
http://www.azueroearthproject.org
http://www.speciesconservation.org/projects/Azuero-Spider-Monkey/586
http://environment.yale.edu/elti/

Spider monkeys
Primates of Central America
Mammals described in 1870
Taxa named by John Edward Gray
Subspecies